James Davidson (born November 1, 1990) is an American football linebacker who is currently a free agent. He played college football at the University of Texas at El Paso and attended Huntsville High School in Huntsville, Texas. He has also been a member of the Cincinnati Bengals, New York Giants and Miami Dolphins of the National Football League.

Early years
Davidson played high school football at Huntsville High School. He was an honorable mention selection on defense to the 2008 Associated Press 4A All-State team and a two-time 18-4A first-team All-District, including a unanimous selection as a senior. He was a second-team All-Area performer and voted as the district's Newcomer of the Year following his junior season in 2007. Davidson registered 63 tackles, three interceptions and three sacks as a senior while recording 84 tackles as a junior.

College career
Davidson played for the UTEP Miners from 2010 to 2013. He was redshirted in 2009.

Professional career

Cincinnati Bengals
Davidson signed with the Cincinnati Bengals on May 12, 2014, after going undrafted in the 2014 NFL Draft. He was released by the Bengals on August 26, 2014.

New York Giants
Davidson was signed to the New York Giants' practice squad on September 16, 2014. He was promoted to the active roster on December 2, 2014, and made his NFL debut on December 7, 2014, against the Tennessee Titans. He was released by the Giants on May 11, 2015.

Miami Dolphins
Davidson signed with the Miami Dolphins on August 17, 2015. He was released by the Dolphins on September 4, 2015.

References

External links
NFL Draft Scout

Living people
1990 births
Players of American football from Texas
American football linebackers
UTEP Miners football players
New York Giants players
People from Huntsville, Texas